A main supply route (MSR) is the route or routes designated within an area of operations upon which the bulk of traffic flows in support of military operations and humanitarian operations. MSR is a term that is also used in insurgency and irregular war scenarios.

Because of the intense and predictable flow of constrained military traffic MSRs can often become targets for opposing forces, as was the case with the Airport Road in Baghdad, a short but dangerous route.

See also

 Line of communication
 Military logistics
 Humanitarian Logistics

References

Military strategy
Military terminology